The Achwa 1 Hydroelectric Power Station (A1HPS), also Achwa I Hydroelectric Power Station, is a hydroelectric power station in Uganda, with a planned installed capacity of .

Location
The facility is located across the Achwa River, in Gulu District, Northern Uganda. This location is within close proximity of the Achwa 2 Hydroelectric Power Station.

Overview
Achwa 1 is a run-of-the-river hydroelectricity project with planned annual output of 274 GWh. This power station is one in a cascade of five power stations planned on the Achwa River totaling . The power generated will be sold to the Uganda Electricity Transmission Company Limited, for integration into the national electricity grid.

Construction
Other infrastructure that will be constructed include  of service roads, a  service road to connect the site to the Gulu-Kitgum Road and a camp for the construction workers.

In 2016, solicitation for bids to carry out feasibility and environmental impact assessments for this power station, were advertised. The development rights are owned by Berkeley Energy, through its wholly owned Ugandan subsidiary, Maji Power Limited.

Works were ongoing as of January 2020.

See also

List of power stations in Uganda
Energy in Uganda

References

External links
 Website of Uganda Electricity Transmission Company Limited (UETCL)

Hydroelectric power stations in Uganda